Steve Rasnic Tem (born 1950) is an American author. He was born in Jonesville, Virginia.

Rasnic attended college at Virginia Polytechnic Institute and State University, and also at Virginia Commonwealth University. He earned a B.A. in English education. In 1974, he moved to Colorado and studied creative writing at Colorado State University. He married Melanie Kubachko, and the couple took the joint surname "Tem". They had four children and lived in Colorado.

Rasnic Tem's short fiction has been compared to the work of Franz Kafka, Dino Buzzati, Ray Bradbury, and Raymond Carver, but to quote Joe R. Lansdale: "Steve Rasnic Tem is a school of writing unto himself." His 200 plus published pieces have garnered him a British Fantasy Award, a World Fantasy Award and a nomination for the Bram Stoker Awards.

Bibliography

Novels
 Excavation (1986)
Daughters (2001) (with Melanie Tem)
The Book of Days (2002)
The Man On The Ceiling (2008) (with Melanie Tem)
 Among The Living (2011)
Deadfall Hotel (2012)
Blood Kin (2014)
 In The Lovecraft Museum (2015)
Ubo (2017, Solaris)
 The Mask Shop Of Doctor Blaack (2018)

Short fiction 
Collections
Decoded Mirrors: Three Tales After Lovecraft (1978)
Fairytales (1985)
Markers (1989, Cemetery Dance Magazine) 
Absences: Charlie Goode's Ghosts (1991)
Celestial Inventory (1991)
Beautiful Stranger (1992) (with Melanie Tem)
City Fishing (2000)
The Far Side of the Lake (2001)
 In Concert (2010) (with Melanie Tem)
 Ugly Behavior (2012)
 Twember (2013)
 Onion Songs (2013)
 Celestial inventories (2013)
 Here With The Shadows (2014)
 Out Of The Dark. A Storybook Of Horrors (2017)
 Figures Unseen. Selected Stories (2018)
 Everything Is Fine Now (2018)
 The Harvest Child and other Fantasies (2018)
 The Night Doctor and Other Tales (2019)
 Thanatrauma (2021)
Stories

Anthologies edited
The Umbral Anthology of Science Fiction Poetry (1982)
High Fantastic: Colorado's Fantasy, Dark Fantasy and Science Fiction (1987)

Poetry 
Collections
The Hydrocephalic Ward (2003)
List of poems

See also
List of horror fiction authors

Notes

External links
Steve Rasnic Tem & Melanie Tem Official Website 
Bibliography

Story behind Celestial Inventories by Steve Rasnic Tem - Online Essay

1950 births
Living people
20th-century American novelists
20th-century American short story writers
20th-century American male writers
21st-century American novelists
21st-century American short story writers
21st-century American male writers
American fantasy writers
American horror writers
American male novelists
American male short story writers
Asimov's Science Fiction people
Colorado State University alumni
Date of birth missing (living people)
Novelists from Virginia
People from Jonesville, Virginia
Virginia Commonwealth University alumni
Virginia Tech alumni
Weird fiction writers
World Fantasy Award-winning writers